David B. Albo (born April 18, 1962) is a retired  Republican politician from the Commonwealth of Virginia, USA. He represented the 42nd district of the Virginia House of Delegates from 1994 to 2018.

Personal
Albo grew up in Springfield, Virginia. He graduated from Fairfax County public schools – Rolling Valley Elementary and West Springfield High School. He has a B.A. degree in economics from the University of Virginia and a J.D. degree from the University of Richmond School of Law.

Political career 
Albo was first elected to the Virginia House of Delegates in 1994. He is the most senior Northern Virginia majority party delegate in the House of Delegates.
Albo is Chairman of the Courts of Justice Committee and a member of the General Laws and Privileges and Elections committees and a member of the Joint Legislative Audit and Review Commission.
Since becoming Chairman of the House of Delegates Courts of Justice committee in 2006 Mr. Albo has overseen the writing of all of the Virginia civil procedure changes including; the creation of the Bill of Complaint as the primary civil pleading, the revision of the jurisdictional limits of the courts, and the modernization of evidentiary law. In addition, Albo has overseen or drafted most of Virginia’s criminal law changes such as; the elimination of parole, the major revision of the drunk driving laws, and most of Virginia’s anti-gang laws. Albo’s complete legislative record is available at lis.virginia.gov.

Major legislation 
Anti-Terrorism Bill: Albo's 2002 bill, HB 1120, defines an act of terror, increases the penalty for possession of bomb material and hoax bomb devices, empowers Virginia law enforcement to effectively respond to terrorism, and outlines the punishment for terrorism. People found guilty of conspiring or committing an act of terror may be subject to either the death penalty or life in prison. The bill was infamously used to prosecute John Allen Muhammad and Lee Boyd Malvo, who were responsible for the “Beltway Sniper Attacks.”

Anonymous Internet Defamation: Albo’s 2015 bill, HB 1635, extends the statute of limitations until the anonymous publisher’s identity is determined in an internet defamation lawsuit. Albo proposed the bill on behalf of a constituent who was the victim of disparaging comments on FairfaxUnderground.com.

Animal Cruelty: Throughout his political career, Albo has supported legislation to protect animals. Organizations such as Humane Dominion have recognized Albo for his efforts. He is responsible for making treatment programs mandatory for animal abuse violators and strengthening penalties for repeat offenders of the animal cruelty statue through his 2007 and 2010 legislation. In 2016, Albo’s bill restored the powers of a standard law enforcement officer for Fairfax County Animal Control Officers.

Cannabis Oil for the treatment of epilepsy: In 1979, Virginia passed a law making possession of marijuana legal for the treatment of cancer and glaucoma legal with a valid prescription from a doctor. However, the term “valid prescription” prevented doctors from prescribing it due to the Federal Schedule 1 status of the drug. The law was in place until Albo’s 2015 legislation, HB 1445, changed the language from “prescription” to “recommendation.” Albo’s bill also added treatment of epilepsy to the acceptable list of illnesses. Albo cites the stories of three constituents’ children as his inspiration, "There are a bunch of kids with Dravet syndrome that have hundreds of seizures and the oil from marijuana alleviates the seizures.” NBC’s Dateline, aired a special series, “Growing Hope.” The series covered the legislative tracking of the bill and personal stories of the patients.

Other notable legislation:
 2004: HB 1080 -Requires an intake officer to notify a school superintendent when a student is involved with a juvenile case relating to gang activity.
 2005: HB 1573 - Increased the penalty for gang-related activity that take place near school property.
 2006: HB 847 - Requires juvenile justice officials to collect data on incarcerated gang members and give their findings to the Commonwealth Attorney’s Services Council. In turn, the Council shares the information with state prosecutors. Albo was also a co-patron on HB 588 which made brandishing a machete near school property a Class 1 misdemeanor.
 2007: HB 2429 - Empowers the Attorney General, with the consent of the local Commonwealth attorney, to assist in the prosecution of certain gang and terrorism crimes. The bill also defines aiding or committing an act of terror as a Class 4 felony.
 2008: HB 820 - Requires correctional facility officers to check the legal status of inmates and report their findings to Local Inmate Data System of the State Compensation Board.
 2010: HB 736 - Requires Virginia circuit courts and Department of State Police to report information to the Virginia Child Protection Accountability System.
 2011: HB 1476 - Extends the limitation period for victims of sexual abuse to take legal action from two years to twenty years.
 2013: HB 1847 - Adds murder, aggravated malicious wounding, and other offenses to the definition of a predicate criminal act involving gang activity.
 2016: HB 177- Adds additional crimes such as engaging prostitution with a minor under the age of 13 to the Sex Offender and Crimes Against Minors Registry Act. Albo is also the chief patron of HB 886, which creates a Class 6 felony for a second stalking offense within five years of the first offense.

Electoral history

Fees for driving violations
Albo supported large surcharges for felony and misdemeanor level driving convictions in 2007, a plan that met strong resistance from some Virginia residents. The money raised by the Virginia bill would to go toward transportation funding. Albo was singled out for criticism in part because his law practice specializes in traffic defense, and could ostensibly gain from the new law. Albo countered by arguing that increased punishments on crimes could possibly lower the occurrence of crimes decreasing business for lawyers. He further pointed out that this was the case with the "Abuser Fees" that lowered the number of Reckless Driving charges.  However, other studies have correlated increased ticketing rates in the years following those in which government revenue has declined.

A primary area of controversy stemmed from the fact that the final bill was amended by the Governor to apply the abuser fees only to Virginia residents, and not those residing in other states. Albo defended the Governor's amendment and described it as a "weakness" but still advocated passage. The following session he voted to repeal his own "Abuser Fees." Responding to the public outcry elected officials repealed the bill in 2008.

Professional career
Albo was an assistant city attorney for the City of Fairfax from 1990–1994, before going into private practice. During the period from 1988 to 1994 Albo was appointed by the courts to serve as guardian ad litem for abused and neglected children. Albo served as President of the West Springfield Civic Association from 1989 to 1993. He was a partner at a law firm that he co-founded, Albo & Oblon, LLP, until the firm closed in 2017. Albo is currently a Partner at WilliamsMullen in Tysons, Virginia.

In 2010, Albo was recognized as one of the “Leaders in the Law” by the Virginia Lawyer’s Weekly for his leadership in improving Virginia’s justice system, changing Virginia law, and his important contributions to Virginia’s legal community.

References

External links
 Delegate David B. Albo at the Virginia House of Delegates
 Dave Albo for State Delegate
 Virginia Legislative Information System

 Biography at Ballotpedia
 Financial information (state office) at the National Institute for Money in State Politics
 
 Profile at Virginia Public Access Project

1962 births
Living people
Republican Party members of the Virginia House of Delegates
Virginia lawyers
University of Virginia alumni
University of Richmond School of Law alumni
People from Springfield, Virginia
People from Flushing, Queens
21st-century American politicians